Wausau is a city in and the county seat of Marathon County, Wisconsin, United States. The Wisconsin River divides the city into east and west. The city's suburbs include Schofield, Weston, Mosinee, Maine, Rib Mountain, Kronenwetter, and Rothschild.

As of the 2020 census, Wausau had a population of 39,994. It is the core city of the Wausau Metropolitan Statistical Area (MSA), which includes all of Marathon County and had a population of 134,063 at the 2010 census.

History

Founding
This area has for millennia changed hands between various indigenous peoples. The historic Ojibwe (also known in the United States as the Chippewa) occupied it in the period of European encounter. They had a lucrative fur trade for decades with French colonists and French Canadians.  After the French and Indian War this trade was dominated by British-American trappers from the eastern seaboard.

The Wisconsin River first drew European-American settlers to the area during the mid-19th century as they migrated west into the Great Lakes region following construction of the Erie Canal in New York State. This provided a route for products from the region to the large New York and other eastern markets. The area had been called "Big Bull Flats" or "Big Bull Falls" by French explorers, who were the first Europeans here. They named it for the long rapids in the river, which created many bubbles, called bulle in French. By an 1836 treaty with the United States, the Ojibwe ceded much of their lands in the area to federal ownership. It was sold to non-Native peoples. Wausau, from Ojibwe “waasa”, means "a faraway place".

George Stevens, the namesake of the city of Stevens Point south of Wausau, began harvesting the pine forests for lumber in 1840 and built a saw mill. Lumbering was the first major industry in this area, and other sawmills along the Wisconsin River were quickly constructed by entrepreneurs. By 1846, Walter McIndoe arrived and took the lead in the local business and community. His efforts helped to establish Marathon County in 1850. Word of Stevens's success in the region spread across the country throughout the logging industry.  Loggers came from Cortland County, New York, Carroll County, New Hampshire, Orange County, Vermont and Down East Maine in what is now Washington County, Maine and Hancock County, Maine.  These were "Yankee" migrants, descended from the English Puritans who settled New England during the 1600s.

Early settlers
By 1852, Wausau had been established as a town and continued to grow and mature. German immigration into the area following the Revolutions of 1848 in the German states brought more people, and by 1861, the settlement was incorporated as a village.

Churches, schools, industry and social organizations began to flourish. The state granted the city a charter in 1872, and elections are held the first Tuesday in April. The residents elected August Kickbusch as their first mayor in 1874. Five years earlier, Kickbusch had returned to his homeland of Germany and brought back with him 702 people, all of whom are believed to have settled in the Wausau area. Kickbusch founded the A. Kickbusch Wholesale Grocery Company, a family business carried on by his grandson, August Kickbusch II. In 1917, August Kickbusch II purchased a modest four-square-style house at 513 Grant Street. He undertook extensive additions, adding two sun rooms, arcaded windows, a tiled porch in the Mediterranean style, a formal classical entrance, and ornate custom-designed chimney crowns. The home is on the National Register of Historic Places as part of the Andrew Warren Historic District.

When the railroad arrived in 1874, Wausau became more accessible to settlers and industry. This enabled the city to develop alternatives to the lumber industry, which was in decline since the clear-cutting of many forests. By 1906 the lumber was gone, but the city continued to grow and flourish. Other villages and towns in the area declined because of over-harvesting of the forests and lumber mills closed down.

Twentieth century

Wausau's favorable location on the Wisconsin River was partly responsible for its survival. The economy was diversified in the early 20th century, led by Employers Insurance of Wausau, now a part of Liberty Mutual. Its logo, first introduced in 1954, was the downtown Milwaukee Road railroad depot set against the backdrop of the community's skyline.

The Wall Street Crash of 1929 had a major effect on the Wausau area. Many industries were forced to cut back by laying off and dismissing workers or by closing altogether. After decades of growth, the city virtually ground to a halt. But after World War II—Wausau was significantly modernized—and it continued to grow in industry, education, recreation, and retail, more than in population.

After the fall of Saigon, Hmong refugees from Southeast Asia who fought alongside the CIA immigrated to Wausau at the end of the 1970s. Wausau church organizations (Catholic and Lutheran) helped Hmong refugees adapt to American life.

In 1983, the Wausau Center shopping mall opened. By the mid- to late-1990s, the Wausau began to purchase and develop parts of West Industrial Park to meet the needs of the expanding economy and companies. In the late 1990s, the city demolished a number of aging buildings on a square in the center of downtown, creating what is known locally as the 400 Block, an open, grassy block with paved sidewalks crossing it. The square is a focal point for summer festivals. In recent years Wausau has redone the 400 Block, adding a permanent stage and other renovations that cost $2 million.

The new millennium
By the end of the 20th century, Wausau began to implement the Wausau Central Business District Master Plan, which included redevelopment and economic restructuring of downtown Wausau. The tallest commercial building in Wisconsin outside of Milwaukee is in Wausau: the 241-foot Dudley tower.

Geography and climate

Geography

Wausau is close to the center of the northern half of the Western Hemisphere. Just west of Wausau, 45°N meets 90°W, which is exactly halfway between the equator and the north pole and a quarter of the way around the world from the prime meridian.

Climate
Wausau's climate is classified as humid continental (Dfb). It is built on or around a hemiboreal forest, which has some of the characteristics of a boreal forest and shares some of the features of the temperate zone forests to the south. Coniferous trees predominate in the hemiboreal zone, but a significant number of deciduous species are found there, as well.

Notes

Demographics

Wausau is the larger principal city of the Wausau–Merrill CSA, a Combined Statistical Area that includes the Wausau metropolitan area (Marathon County) and the Merrill micropolitan area (Lincoln County), which had a combined population of 155,475 at the 2000 census.

In 1996, a US census estimate found the Hmong people were the largest ethnic minority group in Wausau, with about 11% of the population.

2020 census
As of the census of 2020, the population was 39,994. The racial makeup of the city was 78.3% White, 11.9% Asian, 1.7% Black or African American, 0.7% Native American, 1.8% from other races, and 5.6% from two or more races. Ethnically, the population was 4.1% Hispanic or Latino of any race.

2010 census
As of the census of 2010, there were 39,106 people, 16,487 households, and 9,415 families residing in the city. The racial makeup of the city was 83.7% White, 1.4% African American, 0.8% Native American, 11.1% Asian, 0.9% from other races, and 2.3% from two or more races. Hispanic or Latino of any race were 2.9% of the population.

There were 16,487 households, of which 28.1% had children under the age of 18 living with them, 40.7% were married couples living together, 11.5% had a female householder with no husband present, 4.9% had a male householder with no wife present, and 42.9% were non-families. 35.4% of all households were made up of individuals, and 13.1% had someone living alone who was 65 years of age or older. The average household size was 2.31 and the average family size was 3.02.

The median age in the city was 36.8 years. 23.5% of residents were under the age of 18; 10% were between the ages of 18 and 24; 25.9% were from 25 to 44; 24.7% were from 45 to 64; and 15.7% were 65 years of age or older. The gender makeup of the city was 49.1% male and 50.9% female.

2000 census
As of the census of 2000, 38,426 people, 15,678 households, and 9,328 families resided in the city. The population density was 2,330.7 people per square mile (899.7/km2). There were 16,668 housing units at an average density of 1,011.0 per square mile (390.3/km2). The racial makeup of the city was 85.91% White, 0.54% Black or African American, 0.59% Native American, 11.41% Asian, 0.04% Pacific Islander, 0.30% from other races, and 1.21% from two or more races. About 1.04% of the population were Hispanic or Latino of any race.

Of the 15,678 households, 27.8% had children under the age of 18 living with them, 46.7% were married couples living together, 9.5% had a female householder with no husband present, and 40.5% were not families. About 33.6% of all households were made up of individuals, and 14.1% had someone living alone who was 65 years of age or older. The average household size was 2.37 and the average family size was 3.08.

In the city, the population was distributed as 25.4% under the age of 18, 9.6% from 18 to 24, 27.5% from 25 to 44, 20.4% from 45 to 64, and 17.1% who were 65 years of age or older. The median age was 36 years. For every 100 females, there were 92.5 males. For every 100 females age 18 and over, there were 88.3 males.

The median income for a household in the city was $36,831, and for a family was $47,065. Males had a median income of $33,076 versus $24,303 for females. The per capita income for the city was $20,227. About 7.2% of families and 11.4% of the population were below the poverty line, including 18.1% of those under age 18 and 8.4% of those age 65 or over.

Hmong population

As of 2003 the Hmong Americans are the largest ethnic minority in Wausau. Churches and social service agencies settled refugees, most of them Hmong with some Vietnamese and Lao, in Wausau after the Vietnam War. According to the 1980 U.S. Census, the Wausau SMSA had fewer than 1% non-White people. There were several dozen immigrants in 1978. By 1980 Wausau had 200 immigrants. This increased to 400 in 1982 and 800 in 1984.

In 1981 there were 160 Hmong students in the Wausau School District and in 1991 1,010. In a period ending in 1994 the tax rate of the Wausau School District rose by 10.48% as a result of the expenses of services to children from immigrant families. The increase was three times as high as the increase in an adjacent school district without a large immigrant population. By 1994 Wausau had 4,200 refugees. By 1996 the number of Hmong students in the school district was over 2,000. In 1998 this number reached its peak, 2,214. The city experienced some social upheaval following the Hmong arrival. Some schools in Wausau had a minority of English speakers and some were predominantly Hmong students. Some native-born American families in Wausau criticized the crime and expenses in social services.

As of 2003, "Sixty percent of Hmong families are homeowners. Although more than half of the workforce is earning less than $8 an hour, the welfare rate has dropped to less than 5 percent. More people are going to college. And test scores and graduation rates of Hmong public school students are steadily rising."

In Wausau there is relatively little Hmong-language media because for much of its history, the Hmong language was not written.

Government and politics

Wausau has a mayor–council form of government. Eleven elected alderpersons comprise the city council, each representing one district of the city. The City Council manages eight standing committees, including Parks & Recreation, Parking & Traffic, Finance, Human Resources, Public Health & Safety, Economic Development, Coordinating, and Capital Improvement & Street Maintenance.

The current Mayor of Wausau is Katie Rosenberg, 36, sworn on April 21, 2020. She becomes the second woman to serve in the role, and at 36 years old is also one of the youngest mayors according to a mayoral history on the Wausau city website. Rosenberg, a two-term Marathon County board supervisor, defeated incumbent mayor Robert Mielke by five points in the April 7, 2020 election.

Police/Fire

Fire Department

The Wausau Fire Department has 3 stations within the city which contain 5 ambulances, 4 engines, a heavy rescue vehicle, a 100 foot platform truck, rescue boats, inspections vehicles, and command vehicles. The department also has a hazardous incident team, or HIT, which is a type II regional hazardous materials team.

The department currently employs 62 full-time firefighter/paramedics.

The department responded to 6,490 calls in the year 2021.

Police Department

The Wausau Police Department is responsible for law enforcement services in the City of Wausau. On average, between 8–12 officers are on patrol at a time.

Outdoor Warning System
The city of Wausau, in coordination with the Marathon County Sheriff’s Office, is responsible for maintaining 14 outdoor tornado sirens that are strategically placed throughout the city. Sirens are sounded during tornadoes and severe weather. Sirens are tested at 1:15PM every Monday (April–September) and the first Monday of the month (October–March).

Economy
Nearly one-third of the Marathon County economy is based in manufacturing, with the balance in the service industry. Prominent industries include paper manufacturing, insurance, home manufacturing, and tourism. The Wausau region has a lower than average unemployment rate and continues a steady growth in job creation and economic viability among manufacturers and service providers alike. Wausau has 12 banks with 41 branch locations, three trust companies and three holding companies in the metropolitan area. There are also 13 open membership credit unions with 18 branch locations.

The Wausau area is a center for cultivation of American ginseng, and is also known for its red granite, which is quarried nearby.

Education

Public schools
Wausau is served by the Wausau School District, which has 14 elementary schools, two middle schools (John Muir and Horace Mann), and two high schools (Wausau East, Wausau West) and two charter schools (Wausau Engineering and Global Leadership Academy and Enrich Excel Achieve Learning Academy). Wausau Engineering and Global Leadership (EGL) Academy is a public charter school housed in Wausau East High School serving grades 9–12 and emphasizing science, technology, engineering and math.

D.C. Everest Area School District also serves a large part of the Wausau area. This school district has 7 elementary schools, one middle school, one junior high, and one senior high. They also have a 4K Program.

Charter schools

Wausau Area Montessori Charter School serves grades 1–6 and is housed at Horace Mann Middle School. Two kindergarten classes are available at the Montessori Children's Village and Rib Mountain Montessori.

The Excel, Enrich, Achieve (EEA) Learning Academy is a public charter school in the Wausau School District, housed in Wausau East High School, and is for students who do not find the traditional school setting to be a fit for their academic needs. EEA services grades 6–12.

The Idea Charter School, a project-based charter school that is a part of the D.C. Everest School District, had its first year in operation in the 2011–2012 school year. The charter school serves grades 6–12.

Private schools

The city's Roman Catholic parochial schools are known as the Newman Catholic Schools. They include St. Anne, St. Michael and St. Mark, Newman Middle School, and Newman Catholic High School. Other parochial schools include Trinity Lutheran grade school (Lutheran Church–Missouri Synod), Our Savior's Lutheran School (Pre-K–8) (Wisconsin Evangelical Lutheran Synod), Faith Christian Academy (K4–12), and a K–8 school operated by the Seventh-day Adventist Church.

Colleges and universities
Wausau is home to the University of Wisconsin– Stevens Point at Wausau a two-year university satellite campus of the University of Wisconsin-Stevens Point. The University houses the Wisconsin Public Radio Station. The city is also home of Northcentral Technical College, a two-year technical college.

It is also home to a number of satellite campuses of other colleges, including, Upper Iowa University, Lakeland College, Concordia University Wisconsin (closed in 2012), Rasmussen College, Medical College of Wisconsin, and Globe University.

Public libraries
The Marathon County Public Library (MCPL) – Wausau Headquarters, located downtown near the Wausau Center Mall, is the largest library in the Wausau area. It was formed when the county and city libraries merged in 1974. It serves as the headquarters for the Marathon County Public Library system, which encompasses all public libraries in Marathon County, including eight branch libraries. The Marathon County Historical Museum also maintains a library.

Parks
The city's 37 city parks, which total , are maintained by the Wausau and Marathon County Parks, Recreation, and Forestry Department.

Oak Island Community Park and Fern Island Community Park are located next to each other on the Wisconsin River. Oak Island has a wide range of activities: tennis courts, two playgrounds, a baseball diamond, one enclosed shelter with a kitchen, two open shelters, and a walking bridge to Fern Island.  Fern Island Park hosts the annual Big Bull Falls Blues Festival in August, as well as the annual Beer and Bacon Fest.

Athletic Park, a baseball stadium on the east side of Wausau, is home to the Wausau Woodchucks baseball team.

Whitewater Park contains a third of a mile of Class I-II+ rapids along the Wisconsin River in downtown Wausau. It has bleachers facing whitewater rapids where recreational whitewater kayaking and canoeing take place.

Sylvan Hills is a county park within the Wausau city limits.

Marathon Park, another county park in the city of Wausau, is the location of the Wisconsin Valley Fair. The park includes camping grounds, two hockey rinks, a curling barn, playgrounds, an obstacle course, an amphitheater, a bandstand, a grandstand, exhibition buildings, a concessions building, and a miniature golf course. Marathon Park contains the southernmost section of old-growth forest remaining in Wisconsin. The Little Red School House is housed within the park.

Transportation

Airport

 AUW – Wausau Downtown Airport
 CWA – Central Wisconsin Airport

Public transit

Metro Ride provides local bus service. For intercity bus service Wausau is served by Lamers Bus Lines providing once daily trips from Wausau to Milwaukee via Appleton and Coach USA/Van Galder with a daily trip to Janesville via Madison.

Until 1971, Wausau was served by intercity passenger trains at Wausau station.

Roads and highways

Major roads in Wausau are:  Grand Avenue, North 6th St/North 5th St(one-way pair), East and West Bridge St, West Thomas St, 1st Ave/3rd Ave (one-way pair), Stewart Ave, 17th Ave, Merrill Ave, 28th Ave, and East Wausau Ave.

When traveling in Wausau, be aware that numbered "Streets" are on the east side of Wausau and numbered "Avenues" are on the west side of Wausau. The Wisconsin River divides the city between East and West.

Grand Avenue turns into North 6th Street when travelling north into the downtown area. Business 51 is a major route designation that runs through the city mostly along the original route of US 51 before the freeway bypass was constructed in the 1960s. Entering from the south along Grand Ave, north to downtown then splitting into one-way streets; northbound follows 6th St, McIndoe St, N. 1st St, and Scott St to the Wisconsin River; and southbound from the Wisconsin River along Washington St, 1st St, and Forest St back to Grand Ave. Once on the west side of the river, Scott St becomes Stewart Ave. Business 51 turns north off of Stewart Ave onto the one-way 1st Avenue north to W. Union Avenue westerly for two blocks then north out of town along Merrill Ave (southbound from Merrill Ave along 3rd Avenue, then East on Stewart Ave to the Wisconsin River).

Sports
The Wausau Woodchucks baseball team of the Northwoods League, an NCAA summer baseball league, plays home games at the Athletic Park in Wausau. The Wausau Woodchucks were formerly known as the Wisconsin Woodchucks. Woody Woodchuck is the mascot of the Woodchucks.

The Wausau River Hawks baseball team of the Dairyland League, a Wisconsin Baseball Association summer baseball league, plays home games at Athletic Park in Wausau. The Wausau River Hawks were formerly known as Wausau Precision.

Granite Peak Ski Area offers downhill skiing at nearby Rib Mountain. The 700-ft mountain is the highest skiable mountain in the state and one of the highest vertical drops in the Midwest. It first became a ski area in 1937, when Wausau residents cleared six runs by hand, installed the nation's longest ski lift, and built a chalet with stone quarried nearby. Granite Peak has 74 runs and seven ski lifts. Granite Peak earned Ski Magazine's #1 ranking in Wisconsin, Upper Michigan and Minnesota.

Wausau hosts the annual Badger State Winter Games.

Wausau is home to a kayak course which has hosted numerous regional, national, and world competitions over the last two decades.  Nine Mile Recreation Area hosts many running, skiing, biking, and other outdoor events each year.  The annual 24 hour mountain biking race has served as the USA Cycling 24-Hour Mountain Bike National Championships in past years.  Ragnar relay began hosting a trail event at Nine Mile Recreation Area in 2016.  Downhill flow machine built mountain bike trails were constructed and opened in 2017 at Sylvan Hill County Park.

Wausau is also home to the Wausau Curling Club, with an eight-sheet ice surface.  A new curling facility was finished in February 2013. The new curling facility is located next to the former Holtz-Krause Landfill. The new facility has an Olympic size ice rink and will allow for curling tournaments, national and world championship games.

In the summers local softball teams come together to play softball at the Sunnyvale Softball Complex which possesses five softball fields and two volleyball courts. Men's, Women's, JO, and Slow and Fast pitch are played at the softball complex.

In the beginning of 2012, Wausau bought the former Holtz-Krause landfill for plans to build a soccer complex. Building of the soccer complex is expected in 2013 and should be open by 2014 in the fall.

Media and entertainment

Entertainment available in the city includes Exhibitour, Concerts on the Square, Market Place Thursdays, Screen on the Green and the Hmong New Year.

The only local daily newspaper is the Wausau Daily Herald, with a daily circulation of 21,400 during the week and 27,500 on Sunday. City Pages is a free weekly newspaper. Le Dernier Cri is a monthly newspaper that reports on local business.

Wausau is home to the Leigh Yawkey Woodson Art Museum, which houses the "Birds in Art" collection as well as Leigh Yawkey Woodson's collection of decorative glass.

The Grand Theater is located in downtown Wausau. The theater hosts local and national shows.

Notable people

 W. W. Albers, Wisconsin State Senator
 John Altenburgh, jazz/blues musician and composer
 Frank E. Bachhuber, lawyer, businessman, and politician
 Chris Bangle, Chief of Design at BMW Auto Group (grew up in Wausau)
 Marcus H. Barnum, Wisconsin State Representative, businessman, and lawyer
 Wayne R. Bassett Sr. (1915–1988), Minnesota state legislator and librarian, Bassett moved to Wausau and was the head librarian of the Marathon County Library
 Matthew Beebe, Wisconsin State Representative and businessman
 Rudy Bell, Major League Baseball player
 William Belter, Wisconsin State Representative
 Warren Bernhardt, jazz, pop, and classical pianist
 Claire B. Bird, Wisconsin state senator
 Jake Blum, North Dakota State Representative
 Gerald J. Boileau, US congressman
 Emil Breitkreutz, Olympic medalist, head coach of the USC Trojans men's basketball team
 Win Brockmeyer, football coach
 Neal Brown, politician, lawyer, businessman and writer
 Rachel Campos-Duffy, American television personality and conservative activist 
 John C. Clarke, Wisconsin State Representative
 Gloria Coates, musical composer
 Frank Cramer, Biologist, educator and author 
 Charles F. Crosby, Minnesota and Wisconsin legislator, lawyer
 Robert W. Dean, Wisconsin jurist and legislator
 Jim DeLisle, NFL player
 Jeff Dellenbach, NFL player for the Miami Dolphins, New England Patriots, Green Bay Packers, and Philadelphia Eagles
 Sean Duffy, former member of the United States House of Representatives from Wisconsin; former reality TV star on The Real World
 Henry Ellenbecker, Wisconsin State Representative
 Orville Fehlhaber, Wisconsin State Representative
 Bill Fischer, MLB pitcher and coach
 Ellsworth K. Gaulke, Wisconsin educator, businessman, and politician
 Paul Gebert, Sr., Wisconsin State Representative and businesspeople
 Rod Grams, former member of the United States House of Representatives and senator for Minnesota (as a local news anchor in the late 1970s)
 Dave Heaton, Wisconsin State Representative
 Benjamin W. Heineman, former CEO of Chicago and North Western Railway, founder and CEO of Northwest Industries
 Elroy "Crazy Legs" Hirsch, football player, Pro Football Hall of Fame, University of Wisconsin–Madison Athletic Director 1969–1987 and actor
 Charles Hoeflinger, Wisconsin State Representative
 Michael W. Hoover, Presiding Judge of the Wisconsin Court of Appeals
 Victoria Houston, author
 Jalen Johnson, NBA player for the Atlanta Hawks
 Justin L. Johnson, member of the United States House of Representatives from California (1943–1957)
 William A. Kasten, Wisconsin State Representative
 John Azor Kellogg, U.S. military leader and Wisconsin politician
 William P. Kozlovsky, U.S. Coast Guard admiral
 Edward C. Kretlow, Wisconsin State Representative
 Dave Krieg, football player
 Tony Kubek, baseball player and television broadcaster (lived in Wausau in the 1970s and early 1980s)
 Debi Laszewski, IFBB professional bodybuilder
 John E. Leahy, Wisconsin State Senator
 Liberace, pianist/entertainer (lived and worked in Wausau in the 1950s)
 Greg Liter, NFL player
 Paul A. Luedtke, Wisconsin State Assemblyman
 Barbara K. MacDonald, musician, half of the duo Timbuk 3
 Sue R. Magnuson, Wisconsin State Representative
 Mike Manley, Olympic athlete, Pan American Games gold medalist
 Nicole Manske, host of NASCAR Now and The Speed Report
 Herbert H. Manson, chairman of the Democratic Party of Wisconsin
 Rufus P. Manson, Wisconsin State Representative
 Dave Marcis, retired NASCAR driver
 August F. Marquardt, Wisconsin State Representative
 Herman Marth, Wisconsin State Representative
 Marissa Mayer, CEO of Yahoo!
 Edward F. McClain, Wisconsin State Representative
 Myron Hawley McCord, governor of Arizona Territory
 John McCutcheon, folk music singer
 John L. McEwen, Wisconsin State Representative
 Burton Millard, Wisconsin State Representative
 Henry Miller, Wisconsin State Representative and jurist
 Herman Miller
 Walter D. McIndoe, congressman
 Gerald Morris, author
 Thomas T. Moulton, five-time Academy Award winner in sound recording
 Otto Mueller, politician and businessman
 William H. Mylrea, Wisconsin Attorney General
 Burton Natarus, Chicago City Council member and lawyer
 David Obey, member of the United States House of Representatives from Wisconsin from 1969–2011
 Jim Otto, football player, Pro Football Hall of Fame
 Shirley Palesh, baseball player
 Jim Pekol, musician
 B. G. Plumer, legislator and businessman
 Daniel L. Plumer, mayor of Wausau, legislator
 Fred Prehn, Wisconsin State Representative
 Scott Resnick, Wisconsin politician
 Bartholomew Ringle, Wisconsin State Representative
 John Ringle, mayor of Wausau, legislator
 Oscar Ringle, Wisconsin State Representative
 John H. Robinson, mayor of Wausau, legislator
 Sue Rohan, Wisconsin State Representative
 Marvin B. Rosenberry, Chief Justice of the Wisconsin Supreme Court
 Angus B. Rothwell, Superintendent of Public Instruction of Wisconsin
 Johnny Schmitz, baseball player
 Mark Seidl, Wisconsin Court of Appeals judge
 Willis C. Silverthorn, Wisconsin politician
 Leann Slaby, actress, Survivor: Vanuatu contestant
 Brad Soderberg, basketball coach
 Ed Sparr, NFL player
 Michael Stackpole, science fiction author
 Grace Stanke, Miss America 2023
 Alexander Stewart, member of the United States House of Representatives and lumber baron
 Patrick Thomas Stone, United States District Court judge
 Jerome A. Sudut, Medal of Honor recipient
 Ray Szmanda, radio and television personality/spokesperson
 Claude Taugher, Navy Cross and Distinguished Service Cross recipient; NFL player
 Tom Wiesner, Nevada politician and businessman
 Lyman Wellington Thayer, Wisconsin State Senator
 Arthur H. Treutel, Wisconsin State Representative
 Mary Williams Walsh, journalist
 George Werheim, Wisconsin State Representative
 Milt Wilson, professional football player
 Chris Wimmer, NASCAR driver
 Scott Wimmer, NASCAR driver
 Dean Witter, U.S. businessman and founder of Dean Witter & Company investment house
 Cyrus C. Yawkey, businessman
 Charles Zarnke, Wisconsin politician
 Brad Zweck, Wisconsin State Representative

References

External links

City of Wausau
Wausau Regional Chamber of Commerce

 
Cities in Wisconsin
Cities in Marathon County, Wisconsin
County seats in Wisconsin